Nur (Bashkir and ) is a rural locality (a village) in Novosubayevsky Selsoviet, Nurimanovsky District, Bashkortostan, Russia. The population was 96 as of 2010. There is 1 street.

Geography 
Nur is located 20 km east of Krasnaya Gorka (the district's administrative centre) by road. Stary Biyaz is the nearest rural locality.

References 

Rural localities in Nurimanovsky District